The Watson Twins are an American alternative country band based in Los Angeles, formed by identical twin sisters Chandra and Leigh Watson.

Biography
Chandra and Leigh were born on March 28, 1975, in Tulsa, Oklahoma and raised in Louisville, Kentucky. They attended the University of Evansville then moved to the Silver Lake neighborhood of Los Angeles, California in 1997, where they were founding members of Slydell. They also began writing their own music and performing with other local musicians.

In 2006, the Watson Twins released their debut EP, Southern Manners, simultaneously with Rabbit Fur Coat, their collaboration with singer-songwriter Jenny Lewis. Their album, Fire Songs, was released on June 24, 2008. On February 9, 2010, they released Talking To You, Talking To Me on Vanguard Records. The group again toured with Jenny Lewis' band, Nice As Fuck, in 2016.

The group recorded a version of the Neil Young song "Powderfinger" for the American Laundromat Records compilation charity album titled Cinnamon Girl - Women Artists Cover Neil Young for Charity, released in February 2008.
They also recorded a version of The Cure song "Just Like Heaven" for the first soundtrack album from the 
HBO TV series True Blood, released in 2009.

Discography
Rabbit Fur Coat (2006) ("Jenny Lewis with the Watson Twins")
Southern Manners (2006)
Cinnamon Girl - Women Artists Cover Neil Young for Charity (2008)
Fire Songs (2008)
Live at Fingerprints EP (2009)
Talking To You, Talking To Me (2010)
Night Covers - EP (2011)
Pioneer Lane (2013)
DUO (2018)

References

External links 
 
 The Watson Twins on MySpace
 Feature story on The Watson Twins at Country Standard Time
 Interview with The Watson Twins at StereoSubversion.com
 The Watson Twins at prefixmag.com
 PopWreck(oning) interview with Chandra Watson, Pt. I
 PopWreck(oning) interview with Chandra Watson, Pt. II

American country music groups
Identical twin females
Living people
Musical groups from Louisville, Kentucky
Team Love Records artists
1975 births
Vanguard Records artists
American twins
Twin musical duos
Musical groups established in the 2000s
21st-century American women musicians
Folk music duos
Female musical duos
American musical duos